Nicholas Wadham may refer to:
 Nicholas Wadham (1531–1609)
 Nicholas Wadham (1472–1542)